Greenville Airport  is a public airport located three miles (5 km) south of the central business district of Greenville, a city in Bond County, Illinois, United States. It is owned by the Greenville Airport Authority.

Facilities and aircraft 
The airport is capable of handling most aircraft up through the Citation and Lear Jet class. The airport provides a lighted runway, rental hangars, mechanic service, and pilot service.

For the 12-month period ending May 31, 2021, the airport had 25,000 aircraft operations, an average of 68 per day: 22,000 general aviation, 2,000 air taxi and 1,000 military. At that time there were 37 airplanes based at this airport: 36 single-engine and 1 multi-engine.

References

External links 

Airports in Illinois
Transportation buildings and structures in Bond County, Illinois